The 2017 F4 Chinese Championship (Shell Cup FIA F4 Chinese Championship) was the third season of the F4 Chinese Championship. It began on 22 April at the Zhuhai International Circuit and concluded on 29 October at the new Ningbo International Circuit, after seven triple-header rounds, five of them co-hosted with the China Formula Grand Prix championship, and the remaining two being run as a support for the Chinese Touring Car Championship and, in Ningbo, for the World Touring Car Championship.

Teams and drivers

Race calendar
All rounds were held in China.

Championship standings
Points were awarded as follows:

Drivers' Championship

Teams' Cup

References

External links 

  

F4 Chinese Championship seasons
Chinese
F4 Championship
Chinese F4